Saint Jerome Reading in a Landscape is a painting in oil and tempera on panel by Giovanni Bellini or a follower, probably dating to between 1480 and 1485. One of several versions of the theme by the artist, it is now in the National Gallery, London.

It depicts Saint Jerome in the Syrian desert producing the Vulgate Bible, accompanied by the lion from whose paw he extracted a thorn. In the distance is a walled city.

1485 paintings
Paintings by Giovanni Bellini
Collections of the National Gallery, London
Books in art
Lions in art
Paintings of Jerome